Horace Duckett (11 October 1867 – 3 March 1939)  was a rugby union, and professional rugby league footballer who played in the 1890s. He played representative level rugby union (RU) for England, and at club level for Bradford F.C., as a half-back, e.g. scrum-half, or fly-half, i.e. number 9, or 10, and club level rugby league (RL) for Bradford F.C. and Heckmondwike. Prior to Tuesday 27 August 1895, Bradford F.C. was a rugby union club, it then became a rugby league club, and since 1907 it has been the association football (soccer) club Bradford Park Avenue.

Life
Horace Duckett was born in Thornton, Bradford, West Riding of Yorkshire, England, and he died aged 71 in Todmorden, West Riding of Yorkshire.

Duckett's marriage to Florence (née Stansfield) was registered during the fourth quarter of 1913 in Todmorden district.

Playing career

International honours
Horace Duckett won caps for England (RU) while at Bradford F.C. in 1893 against Ireland, and Scotland.

Change of code
When Bradford joined the Northern Union in 1895, Duckett went with them. He played in fourteen games in 1895–96 and in seven games the following season.  In 1897–98 he joined Heckmondike and played in eight games before retiring.

Note
Duckett's surname is variously spelt correctly with an "e" as Duckett, or incorrectly with an "i" as Duckitt.

References

External links
Statistics at espnscrum.com
Search for "Duckett" at rugbyleagueproject.org
Search for "Duckitt" at rugbyleagueproject.org

1867 births
1939 deaths
Bradford F.C. players
England international rugby union players
English rugby league players
English rugby union players
Rugby league players from Bradford
Rugby union halfbacks
Rugby union players from Bradford